Lieutenant-Colonel Sir Arthur Whitten Brown,  (23 July 1886 – 4 October 1948) was a British military officer and aviator who flew as navigator of the first successful non-stop transatlantic flight with pilot John Alcock in June 1919.

Biography
Arthur Whitten Brown was born in Glasgow to American parents; his father had been sent to Scotland to evaluate the feasibility of siting a Westinghouse factory on Clydeside. The factory was eventually sited in Trafford Park in Stretford, Manchester, and the family subsequently relocated there.

Brown began his career in engineering before the outbreak of World War I and undertook an apprenticeship with British Westinghouse in Manchester. In 1914, he enlisted in the ranks of the University and Public Schools Brigade (UPS) for which he had to take out British citizenship. The ranks of the UPS were full of potential officers and Brown was one of those who sought a commission to become a Second Lieutenant in the 3rd (Special Reserve) Battalion of the Manchester Regiment. After service in France, Brown was seconded to 2 Squadron Royal Flying Corps as an observer.

Brown's aircraft was shot down by anti-aircraft fire over Vendin-le-Vieil in France while on artillery observation duties. He was sent back to England to recuperate but returned only to be shot down again, this time with a punctured fuel tank, near Bapaume in B.E.2c (number 2673) on a reconnaissance flight on 10 November 1915. Brown and his pilot, 2nd Lt. H. W. Medlicott, were captured by the Germans. (In June 1918 Medlicott was shot by the Germans while attempting to escape for the fourteenth time). Later interned in Switzerland, Brown was repatriated in September 1917.

After a period of leave he went to work with Major Kennedy RAF in the Ministry of Munitions. This led Brown to meet Kennedy's daughters, one of whom he later married. After the war Brown sought various appointments that would give him the security to allow him to marry. One of the firms he approached was Vickers, a consequence of which was that he was asked if he would be the navigator for the proposed transatlantic flight, partnering John Alcock, who had already been chosen as pilot.

Transatlantic flight

The flight from St. John's, Newfoundland, to Clifden, Connemara, Ireland, took place on 14 June 1919. They departed St John's at 1.45 pm local time, and landed in Derrygimla bog 16 hours and 12 minutes later after flying 1,980 miles (3,168 km). The flight was made in a modified Vickers Vimy bomber, and won a £10,000 prize offered by London's Daily Mail newspaper for the first non-stop flight across the Atlantic. A few days after the flight both Brown and Alcock were honoured with a reception at Windsor Castle during which King George V invested them with their insignia as Knights Commanders of the Order of the British Empire.

Post flight career

Later he worked for Metropolitan-Vickers (MetroVick), the company that had once been British Westinghouse. In 1923 he was appointed chief representative for Metropolitan-Vickers in the Swansea area.

During World War II Brown served in the Home Guard as a Lieutenant-Colonel before resigning his commission in July 1941, rejoining the RAF and working in RAF Training Command as a pilot officer dealing with navigation. His health deteriorated and by mid-1943 he had to resign from the RAFVR and give up his Air Training Corps commitments on medical advice.

Brown's only son, Arthur (known as Buster), was killed on the night of 5/6 June 1944, aged 22, while serving with the RAF as a Flight Lieutenant. His aircraft, a de Havilland Mosquito VI NT122, of 605 Squadron, crashed in the Netherlands. Buster was buried at the general cemetery in Hoorn, the town closest to the crash. The death of his only son affected Brown badly.

By 1948 Brown's health had again deteriorated, although he was allowed to undertake restricted duties as general manager for Metropolitan-Vickers at the Wind Street offices.

Brown died in his sleep on 4 October 1948 from an accidental overdose of Veronal, a sleeping pill, aged 62.

Brown and his wife's ashes are interred at St Margaret Churchyard, Tylers Green, Buckinghamshire, England.

Works
; reprint READ BOOKS, 2008, 
Our Transatlantic Flight, Alcock and Brown, William Kimber, 1969,

See also
 Transatlantic flight of Alcock and Brown
 Transatlantic flight

References

External links
 Photograph of Britannia Airways Boeing 737 named "Sir Arthur Whitten Brown"
 

1886 births
1948 deaths
British aviators
Aviation pioneers
British navigators
Military personnel from Glasgow
Flight navigators
Knights Commander of the Order of the British Empire
Royal Flying Corps officers
British Army personnel of World War I
British Home Guard officers
Royal Air Force officers
British World War I prisoners of war
World War I prisoners of war held by Germany
Manchester Regiment officers
Deputy Lieutenants of Glamorgan
Alumni of the University of Manchester Institute of Science and Technology
People from Stretford
British people of American descent
Naturalised citizens of the United Kingdom
Drug-related deaths in England
Burials in Buckinghamshire
Metropolitan-Vickers people
Royal Air Force personnel of World War II
Shot-down aviators